Arya Samaj (Hindi: आर्य समाज सिंगापुर) has existed in Singapore since 1927 and runs Hindi classes at its premises through the Dayanand Anglo-Vedic Schools System.

History
In 1927, Arya Samaj was established in Singapore in a shophouse in Rowell Road.
 
From 1942 to 1945, during the Second World War the activities of the Arya Samaj were interrupted by the Japanese occupation of Singapore.
 
In 1963, the Arya Samaj movement's present building at Syed Alwi Road was opened by Mollamal Sachdev, whose family gave generously to the building fund.

In 2014, on 1 and 2 November, Arya Samaj Singapore celebrated International Arya Conference (Hindi: अंतर्राष्ट्रीय आर्य महा सम्मलेन) to mark 101 years of the Arya Samaj movement.

In 2015, the inaugural International Yoga Day (Hindi: अंतर्राष्ट्रीय योग दिवस) was celebrated by the Arya Samaj.

Arya Bhawan Singapore
The Arya Bhawan Singapore (Hindi: आर्य भवन सिंगापुर) building at Syed Alwi Road is used as a community hall for weddings and other traditional Hindu festivals such as Deepavali and Holi.

DAV Hindi School, Singapore
DAV Hindi School, Singapore (Hindi: दयानन्द अंग्लोवेदिक हिंदी विधालय, सिंगापुर) is run by the Arya Samaj to teach Hindi language at its premises through the D.A.V. Hindi School. Although English is the language of instruction in Singapore schools, mother tongue is a compulsory subject at the Primary School Leaving Examination (PSLE), Singapore-Cambridge GCE Ordinary Level ('O' Level) and Singapore-Cambridge GCE Advanced Level ('A' Level) and DAV Hindi School, Singapore cover the syllabus for those.

Singapore Arya Vedic Library
The Singapore Arya Vedic Library (Hindi: सिंगापुर आर्य वैदिक पुस्तकालय) is located at Arya Samaj Bhawan at Syed Alwi Road. It houses Vedic and Arya Samaj books.

Membership
In 1975, the membership of the Arya Samaj in Singapore stood at approximately 350.

See also

 Context 
 1915 Singapore Mutiny
 Greater India
 History of Indian influence on Southeast Asia
 History of Singaporean Indians
 Indian diaspora
 Indianisation
 Indian National Army in Singapore
 Hinduism in South East Asia
 Indian-origin religions and people in Singapore
 Hinduism in Singapore
 Jainism in Singapore
 Indian Singaporeans
 List of Hindu temples in Singapore
 Lists of Hindu temples by country
 List of Indian organisations in Singapore

References 

Arya Samaj
Schools affiliated with the Arya Samaj
Hindi-language education
Overseas Indian organisations
Education in Singapore
Libraries in Singapore